Gina Maria Ortiz Jones (born February 1, 1981) is an American intelligence officer and politician. She was confirmed as President Biden's Under Secretary of the Air Force by the Senate on July 22, 2021.

The 2018 Democratic nominee for Texas's 23rd congressional district, Ortiz Jones was the first gay woman of color and military veteran running for office in Texas. She narrowly lost to the incumbent Republican Will Hurd. In May 2019, she launched a second campaign for the office. In the November 2020 general election, Republican nominee Tony Gonzales defeated Ortiz Jones by four percentage points.

Early life and education
Born on February 1, 1981, in Arlington, Virginia, Jones grew up in San Antonio, Texas, as a first-generation American daughter of a single mother, Victorina Ortiz, an Ilocano from Pangasinan, Philippines. Her mother emigrated to the U.S. and earned a teaching certificate.
Jones attended college on a Reserve Officers' Training Corps scholarship, after which she became a United States Air Force intelligence officer, served in the Iraq War, and eventually reached the rank of captain.

Jones graduated from John Jay High School in 1999. She earned a four-year Air Force Reserve Officer Training Corps (AFROTC) scholarship, allowing her to enroll at Boston University. In 2003, she graduated with a bachelor's degree in East Asian studies and a master's degree in economics. A lesbian who came out to her mother at 15, Jones served under the military's "don't ask, don't tell" policy, where she was at risk of losing her AFROTC scholarship if her sexual orientation was disclosed.

She later earned a master's degree in military arts and sciences at the School of Advanced Military Studies of the United States Army Command and General Staff College.

Career

After graduating from college, Jones joined the United States Air Force, becoming an intelligence officer. She was later deployed to Iraq with the 18th Air Support Operations Group, supporting close air support operations. After three years of active duty and reaching the rank of captain, Jones returned to Texas in 2006, working for a consulting company while caring for her mother, who had colon cancer (from which she eventually recovered).

She then returned to working as an intelligence analyst for United States Africa Command in Germany. In 2008, Jones joined the Defense Intelligence Agency, where she specialized in Latin American topics; ultimately she became a special adviser to the deputy director. In November 2016, she moved to the Executive Office of the President to serve under the Office of the United States Trade Representative. Having previously served under presidents of both parties, Jones continued in her role during the Trump administration until June 2017, when she left her role, telling HuffPost, "The type of people that were brought in to be public servants were interested in neither the public nor the service ... That, to me, was a sign that I'm going to have to serve in a different way." She returned to San Antonio to run for Congress, living in the house where she grew up.

2018 congressional campaign

In 2017, Ortiz Jones was the first Democrat to announce a challenge to Republican Representative Will Hurd in Texas's predominantly Hispanic 23rd congressional district, which includes much of the border between Texas and Mexico. Hillary Clinton won the district by three points in the 2016 United States presidential election and neither party had controlled the swing district for more than two consecutive terms since 2007.

Ortiz Jones finished first in the March 6, 2018, Democratic primary, earning 41 percent of the vote in a field of five. A runoff election was held on May 22, which Ortiz Jones won. She faced Hurd in the November 6 general election, in what was called the most competitive congressional race in the state. As of June 30, Ortiz Jones had raised $2.2 million while Hurd had raised $2.4 million in addition to the $1.5 million with which he entered the race. With four months remaining, Jones was approaching the district's record for election fundraising by a Democrat ($2.7 million).

Ortiz Jones was endorsed by EMILY's List, the Asian American Action Fund, the Equality PAC, VoteVets, and the LGBTQ Victory Fund, as well as Wendy Davis and Khizr Khan.

Media coverage named Ortiz Jones as part of several "waves" of candidates from various backgrounds running as Democrats in 2018, including women, LGBT people, and military veterans. A March 2018 Teen Vogue article noted that if elected, Ortiz Jones would be "the first openly gay woman of color from Texas elected to Congress, as well as the first Iraq War veteran to represent Texas in Congress. She'd also be the first woman to represent Texas's 23rd Congressional district."

Ortiz Jones said she believed health care reform would play a big role in the election. She and Hurd both broke fundraising records.

Ortiz Jones lost to Hurd by 1,150 votes and conceded on November 19.

2020 congressional campaign

In May 2019, Ortiz Jones launched a second campaign for Texas's 23rd congressional district. She has raised over $1 million for her campaign, including $100,000 in the 24 hours following Hurd's August 2019 announcement that he would not seek reelection. In October 2019 The Texas Tribune reported that she was the primary front-runner. In May 2020, former presidential candidate Pete Buttigieg's Win the Era PAC endorsed Jones.

In the November general election, Republican nominee Tony Gonzales defeated Ortiz Jones by four percentage points.

Personal life
Jones has a younger sister who is an intelligence officer in the United States Navy. She identifies as an Ilocano, a Filipino ethnolinguistic group.

References

External links

 
 

Interview on Bloomberg Television (July 12, 2018)

|-

 
|-

1981 births
21st-century American politicians
21st-century American women politicians
United States Air Force personnel of the Iraq War
American LGBT military personnel
American military personnel of Filipino descent
American people of Ilocano descent
American politicians of Filipino descent
American women of Filipino descent in politics
Biden administration personnel
Boston University College of Arts and Sciences alumni
Candidates in the 2018 United States elections
Female officers of the United States Air Force
Lesbian military personnel
Lesbian politicians
American LGBT people of Asian descent
LGBT appointed officials in the United States
Living people
Military personnel from Virginia
People from Arlington County, Virginia
Military personnel from San Antonio
Texas Democrats
United States Air Force officers
United States Army Command and General Staff College alumni
United States Under Secretaries of the Air Force
University of Kansas alumni
Women in Texas politics